In marketing and sales, marketing collateral is a collection of media used to support the sales of a product or service. Historically, the term "collateral" specifically referred to brochures or sell sheets developed as sales support tools.  These sales aids are intended to make the sales effort easier and more effective.

The brand of the company usually presents itself by way of its collateral to enhance its brand through a consistent message and other media, and must use a balance of information, promotional content, and entertainment.

Overview
Common examples include:

 Sales brochures and other printed product information
 Visual aids used in sales presentations
 Web content
 Sales scripts
 Demonstration scripts
 Product data sheets
 Product white papers
 Promotional pictures

See also
 Enterprise content management
 Content creation

References

Personal selling